The Desert Scorpion (originally titled The Last of the Open Range) is a 1920 American silent Western film directed by Otis B. Thayer and starring Edmund Cobb and Vida Johnson. The film was shot in Denver, Colorado by the Thayer's Art-O-Graf film company.

Plot
A feud between sheepherders and cattlemen heats up when the cattlemen set fire to the sheepherder's homes. The Sheepherder, who is in love with the Cattle Queen's daughter, leads a robbery on the cattlemen's bank. The Sheriff's daughter is impregnated and deserted by the Cattle Queen's daughter's fiancé. The sheepherders rescue her and abduct the Cattle King's daughter to nurse her back to health. The cattlemen track them back to the cabin where everything is revealed and forgiven. And the Cattle Queen's daughter falls in love with the Sheepherder.

Cast
 Edmund Cobb as the Sheepherder
 Vida Johnson as his daughter
 Clare Hatten as the Cattle Queen
 Otis B. Thayer as the Sheriff
 Gretchen Wood as a sheepherder's wife
 Zelma Edwards 
 Frank Gallager
 A. E. McCormick
 Dave Campbell
 Babe Courvoisier
 Fred Shafer
 Lewis Milner

Crew
 Otis B. Thayer Managing Director
 Vernon L. Walker Head Cameraman
 H. Haller Murphy Cameraman

References

External links

 

1920 films
1920 Western (genre) films
American black-and-white films
Arrow Film Corporation films
Films directed by Otis B. Thayer
Films shot in Colorado
Silent American Western (genre) films
1920s English-language films
1920s American films